Chicago, Illinois, is the third-largest city in the United States and a world transit hub. The area is served by two major airports, numerous highways, elevated/subway local train lines, and city/suburban commuter rail lines; it is the national passenger rail hub for Amtrak routes, and also the main freight rail hub of the North America.

Surface transportation networks and public ways within the city are the responsibility of the Chicago Department of Transportation. Mass transit in much of the Chicago metropolitan area is managed through the Regional Transportation Authority (RTA), which was installed by referendum in 1974. The RTA provides transportation services through the funding of three subordinate agencies: the Chicago Transit Authority, Metra, and Pace. Operation of the city's airports is the responsibility of the Chicago Department of Aviation.

Airports
O'Hare International Airport, which is the second busiest airport in the world by one measure, is a major airport serving numerous domestic and international destinations. It is a hub for United Airlines and American Airlines. Construction is underway for a major expansion. This airport is statistically one of the busiest in the United States.
Midway Airport serves primarily domestic destinations, Toronto, and select Mexican cities. It is a major focus city for Southwest Airlines.
Chicago had a third airport, Meigs Field, until it was demolished in 2003.

There are several other smaller commercial airports in the Chicago area, these include:
Gary/Chicago International Airport in Gary, Indiana, located about 25 miles SE from the Chicago loop. It is operating as the de facto "third airport" for the Chicago area. While the airport's current operations do not include scheduled commercial passenger service, the administration is marketing to airlines and in talks with the U.S. Customs and Border Protection. Recently completed field improvements included extending the main runway to 8,859 feet, longer than any at Midway by some 2,000 feet. Corporations including Boeing and White Lodging Services base their corporate fleets here, and there are two Fixed Base Operators (FBO). The National Guard has constructed facilities to base their Chicago metropolitan area air operations here as well.
Chicago Rockford International Airport in Rockford, which supports scheduled passenger airline service to many cities in the United States and many cargo flights. Rockford officials are positioning the airport to attract customers from Chicago's western suburbs.
A public heliport called Chicago Vertiport opened in 2015 near the Illinois Medical District.

Milwaukee Mitchell International Airport in Milwaukee is also used by residents of Chicago's northern suburbs looking to avoid the congestion of the two main Chicago airports. South Bend International Airport in South Bend, Indiana is connected to downtown Chicago via a South Shore Line station.

Suburban airports and airfields

Proposed airports
A Chicago south suburban airport has been proposed as a regional airport in far-south-suburban Peotone, Illinois.

Cycling

Chicago maintains a 290-mile network of bikeways - including shared use paths, cycle tracks, and bike lanes - for private, public, and commercial bicycle use. Bicycles are allowed to operate on all Chicago roadways, except limited access highways.

A bicycle sharing system known as Divvy operates thousands of public bikes at 580 stations in Chicago, Evanston, and Oak Park.

Pedicabs are available for hire at various locations and events around Chicago with high pedestrian traffic.

Bicycles are available for rent at rental shops concentrated along the lakefront in the Loop and Near North Side community areas.

Several delivery companies operate bicycle courier services mainly in the Loop area.

Bicycles on transit
Bicycles are permitted on CTA buses via front-mounted bicycle racks and onboard CTA trains weekdays excluding the rush hours from 7 to 9 a.m. and 4 to 6 p.m. On weekends and holidays, bicycles are allowed on trains all day except for special events.

Bicycles are allowed onboard Metra commuter rail service during off-peak and non-event times and in reverse peak directions during rush hours.

Bicycles are only allowed on designated South Shore Line commuter rail service trains as part of a pilot program active during non-winter months.

Bicycles are allowed on water taxis during off-peak and weekend hours.

Transit systems

Chicago Transit Authority
The Chicago Transit Authority, or CTA, one of three service boards within the Regional Transportation Authority, operates the second largest public transportation system in the United States (to New York's Metropolitan Transportation Authority) and covers the City of Chicago and 40 surrounding suburbs. The CTA operates 24 hours a day and, on an average weekday, 1.6 million rides are taken on the CTA.

CTA has approximately 2,000 buses that operate over 152 routes and 2,273 route miles (3,658 km). Buses provide about 1 million passenger trips a day and serve more than 12,000 posted bus stops. CTA trains provide about 745,000 customer trips each day and serve 144 stations in Chicago, Evanston, Skokie, Wilmette, Rosemont, Forest Park, Oak Park, and Cicero.

Chicago is one of the few cities in the United States that provides rapid transit service to two major airports. From the downtown area, the Blue Line reaches O'Hare International Airport in about 40 minutes, while the Orange Line takes customers to Midway Airport in about 25 minutes from the Loop.

Bus services

Suburban
Pace, another service board within the Regional Transportation Authority, operates a primarily-suburban bus service that also offers some routes into Chicago.

Inter-city
Several intercity bus companies offer service to other cities in Illinois and across the United States. Most operate to and from the Greyhound Lines terminal, located at 630 West Harrison Street (corner of Des Plaines Street). Greyhound Lines operates the majority of the inter-city bus service to and from Chicago, with routes connecting Chicago with Indianapolis, Cincinnati, Louisville, Nashville, Atlanta, Cleveland, Pittsburgh, Washington, New York, Detroit, Toronto, Milwaukee, Green Bay, Madison, Minneapolis, St. Louis, Memphis, intermediate points, and connecting with other points beyond. Both Barons Bus Lines and Miller Transportation connect Chicago with Fort Wayne and Columbus. Indian Trails connects Chicago with Kalamazoo, Lansing, Flint, and Bay City. Burlington Trailways connects Chicago with Rockford, Dubuque, Davenport, Burlington, Des Moines, Omaha, and Denver.

Other inter-city bus companies use their own separate inter-city bus terminals. Megabus, a subsidiary of Coach USA, departs from a curbside bus stop near Union Station, on Canal Street south of Jackson Boulevard, and connects Chicago with Indianapolis, Cincinnati, Louisville, Nashville, Cleveland, Columbus, Cleveland, Detroit, Milwaukee, Madison, Minneapolis, Des Moines, Omaha, St. Louis, Memphis, Kansas City, intermediate points, and connecting with other points beyond. Van Galder Bus Company, another subsidiary of Coach USA, departs from a curbside bus stop at Union Station, on Canal Street north of Jackson Boulevard, and connects Chicago with Rockford and Madison. Several bus companies catering to Hispanic passengers connect Chicago with points in Texas, and with connections throughout Mexico. These companies include El Expreso Bus Company, Omnibus Express, Los Paisanos Autobuses, Tornado Bus Company, Turimex Internacional, National Charter Bus, Chicago Charter Bus Company and GOGO Charters.

Rail services

Commuter

Metra is Chicago's commuter railroad, with eleven lines that serve 200+ stations across Cook County and the five collar counties. Unlike the 'L' lines, fare pricing is based on zones instead of a flat boarding fee. In addition, being mainly commuter rail service, frequent service is generally only provided during rush hours, although Metra is known for its speed and reliability. There are eleven lines, three of which also have service along additional branch lines: in addition to the main lines, the Metra Electric District has two branches, and the Rock Island District and Union Pacific Northwest have one branch each. Each line connects into one of four different downtown stations: Union Pacific North, West, and Northwest arrive in the Richard B. Ogilvie Transportation Center (known more casually as the "North Western Station"); Milwaukee District North and West, North Central Service, SouthWest Service, BNSF Railway, and Heritage Corridor converge in Union Station (which is also the nexus of Amtrak); the Rock Island District arrives in the LaSalle Street Station; and the Metra Electric District arrives in Millennium Station (formerly Randolph Street Terminal).

The Metra Electric District is Chicago's oldest continuing commuter train (1856), and shares the railway with the South Shore Line, operated by the Northern Indiana Commuter Transit District (NICTD), which is a separate but analogous quasi-governmental entity, partially funded by the RTA. The South Shore Line is an interurban railroad that operates between Chicago and South Bend, Indiana. Like the Metra Electric District, it arrives and departs from Millennium Station.

Inter-city

Amtrak owns and operates Union Station, the fourth-largest intercity passenger hub in the United States. The station is the focus of many of Amtrak's transcontinental routes. Unlike most of Amtrak's major stations, all trains calling at Union Station either originate or terminate there; passengers coming through Chicago must transfer to another train to reach their destination. It provides connections to Metra and the 'L.'

Before Amtrak's takeover of passenger service in 1971, trains ran out of Central Station, Dearborn Station, LaSalle Street Station and Chicago and North Western Terminal as well as Union Station.

Chicago Express Loop
The Chicago Express Loop is a proposed high speed rapid transit line connecting the Loop to O'Hare airport.

Tourist trolleys
The City of Chicago offered free tourist trolleys that served the downtown area. The "trolleys" were actually buses painted to look like historical streetcars. They ran every 20 to 30 minutes and served areas popular with tourists that did not have 'L' stations, such as the Museum Campus, Navy Pier, and the Magnificent Mile. The Free Trolley service was permanently discontinued in 2009.

The free trolleys should not be confused with the private-sector Chicago Trolley Company, which offers guided tours and charge fares. They serve different routes but largely the same downtown area. Their vehicles are also buses rather than real trolleys.

Chicago public transportation statistics
The average Chicago commuter spends 86 minutes every day traveling to and from work on public transit. Of public transit riders, 28.% ride for more than 2 hours every day. On average, commuters wait at stops or stations for 15 minutes; 21% of riders wait for over 20 minutes.

Roads and expressways

Taxis
Chicago taxicabs are privately operated under a medallion license from the city. Chicago taxi regulations were revamped in a 2012 reform package backed by Mayor Rahm Emanuel; the package raised the "flag pull" initial hire charge by $1, mandated credit card readers and GPS, and placed new limits on fleet age.

City and private initiatives have increased the proportion of hybrid and alternative fuel vehicles from less than one percent to over 74 percent of the city's cab fleet since 2008.

Water
Chicago waterways are used extensively for commercial shipping, passenger ferry service, and recreational boating. Navigable waterways within Chicago include Lake Michigan, the Chicago River, the Calumet River, and the Chicago Sanitary and Ship Canal. In part, these waterways comprise the Chicago Area Waterway System, which forms the only inland link between the Great Lakes and the Mississippi River. This potential link was a major factor in the establishment of Chicago itself.

Commercial shipping
The Port of Chicago, once centered on the Chicago River but since moved to the Lake Calumet area, is responsible for Chicago's commercial shipping traffic.

Passenger ferry service

Passenger ferry service in Chicago is handled by commercial water taxis operating on defined routes on published schedules.

Shoreline Sightseeing offers water taxi service along the Chicago River with stops at Navy Pier, Michigan Avenue, and Adams Street. They offer a separate route from Navy Pier to the Museum Campus.

Wendella Boats operates the Chicago Water Taxi which offers scheduled service along the Chicago River with stops at Michigan Avenue, Clark Street, Madison Street (Ogilvie and Union train stations), Chicago Avenue, North Avenue, and Ping Tom Park in Chinatown.

Recreational boating
Recreational boat traffic in Chicago includes tour boats, sailboats, powerboats, electric boats, canoes, and kayaks. This traffic originates from numerous private and commercial marinas and slips, and the Chicago Park District operates a municipal harbor system for the seasonal storage of recreational watercraft in Lake Michigan. With accommodations for 6000 boats, it is the largest system of its kind in the nation. Boat rentals are available on both the Chicago River and within harbors on Lake Michigan.

See also

Chicago City Railway
Taxicabs of Chicago
Chicago Traction Wars

References

External links

 Chicago Transit Authority
 Metra Commuter Rail Division
 Pace Suburban Bus
 Regional Transportation Authority (RTA)
 Fly Chicago, Chicago Department of Aviation

 

ml:ചിക്കാഗോ വിമാനത്താവളം